The Medvezhiy Glacier (Bear Glacier) is an Alpine glacier in Tajikistan. The glacier is located on the western slope of the Academy of Sciences Range at the heart of the Pamir Mountains.

References

Bibliography
 Novikov, V. (2002) Severe Hydrometeorological Events and their Fluctuation. World Meteorological Organization, CBS Teschnical Conference poster, Accessed July 29, 2011.
 United Nations Environment Programme/GRID-Arendal (2007) Formation of lakes and glacier lake outburst floods (GLOFs) by Medvezhi Glacier, Pamirs. Accessed July 29, 2011.
 UN Chronicle (2009) Global Warming and Surging Glaciers. Accessed July 29, 2011.

Glaciers of Tajikistan
Pamir Mountains